David Spencer Gregory (born 23 January 1970) is an English retired professional footballer who played as a midfielder. He played alongside his brother Neil whilst at Colchester United and Canvey Island.

Career
Born in Polstead, Gregory began his career at Ipswich Town, making 32 appearances between 1987–1995. He made two appearances on loan at Hereford United and three appearances at Peterborough United after leaving Ipswich. He joined Colchester United in 1995 and spent seven years at Layer Road, making 226 league appearances and scoring 19 goals. Gregory helped the U's to their first league promotion for 22 years in 1998 when he stepped up to put Colchester ahead from the spot in the Third Division playoff final. Gregory made history along with Neil as the first pair of brothers in a play-off final in the same match. His brother Neil joined the U's in 1998 and played alongside David until 2000. Gregory featured regularly in the first team until he cracked a bone in his foot playing against Port Vale in March 2002 and failed to recover fitness by the summer break. He again teamed up with his brother Neil at Canvey Island in July 2002.

After his retirement from playing, David joined the Colchester United media department as a Communications and PR Officer and, in April 2013, he was inducted into the club's Hall of Fame having scored the winning penalty in the 1998 Wembley play-off final.

Honours

Club
Colchester United
 Football League Division Three Playoff Winner (1): 1997–98
 Football League Trophy Runner-up (1): 1996–97

References

External links
 
 
 David Gregory at Coludata.co.uk

1970 births
Living people
English footballers
Ipswich Town F.C. players
Hereford United F.C. players
Peterborough United F.C. players
Colchester United F.C. players
Canvey Island F.C. players
Wivenhoe Town F.C. players
Premier League players
English Football League players
Association football midfielders
People from Polstead